Stenorhopalus bicolor is a species of beetle in the family Cerambycidae. It was described by Philippi in 1865.

References

Beetles described in 1865
Necydalinae